Repentance is the ninth studio album by Esham. Released in 2003, it is his first album of new material to be released on Psychopathic Records, and his second album on the label overall, after the compilation Acid Rain.

Lyrics and music
Because much of Smith's most well-known material had contained lyrics that were Satanic in nature, he had long been accused of Satanism and had long attempted to shed such perceptions. Repentance was produced as an attempt to "set the [...] record straight" and leave his former "Unholy" stage persona behind him. The album was originally announced under the title Redemption.

The song "Woo Woo Woo Woo" was released as a single, and a music video for the song was filmed by Roy Knyrim. In both instances, the song is identified as "Woo Woo Woo", even though it is referred to as "Woo Woo Woo Woo" on the album itself, and in the chorus. Although the video aired in rotation on BET and MTV 2, Esham decided to direct his own music videos because he disliked the way this video turned out.

Reception
Repentance peaked at #9 on the Top Heatseekers chart, #10 on the Top Independent Albums chart, and #71 on the Top R&B/Hip-Hop Albums chart. In his review of the album, Allrovi's Jason Birchmeier wrote that "Repentance is a small step forward for Esham. He seems very confident here, comfortable with himself as an artist" and that "when he pulls everything together [...] he makes some of the best music of his long, fruitful, yet largely unacknowledged career."

(All songs written by Esham except tracks 6, 8 and 14, which were written by Puwal)

Track listing

Personnel
Esham - performer
Mike Puwal. - guitar

Production
Producer: Esham
Engineers: Esham, Fritz "the Cat" Van Kosky, Mike P.
Mixing: Esham, Fritz "the Cat" Van Kosky, Mike P.
Arranger: Esham

Charts
Album - Billboard (North America)

Singles

References

2003 albums
Albums produced by Esham
Esham albums
Psychopathic Records albums